Newton Township is the name of some places in the U.S. state of Michigan:

 Newton Township, Calhoun County, Michigan
 Newton Township, Mackinac County, Michigan

See also 
 Newton Township (disambiguation)

Michigan township disambiguation pages